Sichilde (ca. 590–627) was a Frankish queen consort in 618–627; married to Chlothar II.

She was the daughter of the Count Brunulphe II of the Ardennes and the sister of Gomentrude (598–630), who was married to Dagobert I; her maternal grandfather was royal maior domus. She married Chlothar in about 618. In 626 or 627, she was suspected of having had a relationship with Boso, son of Audolène of Étampes, and Boso was killed by the duke Arnebert on the order of Chlothar.

References

Frankish queens consort
7th-century Frankish women
7th-century Frankish nobility